This is a list of the twenty best-selling singles on the Media Control Charts in Germany for every year since 2000. The data, provided by Media Control, is based on the singles sold.

2000

2001

2002

2003

2004

2005

2006

2007

2008

2009

2010

2011

2012

2013

2014

2015

2016

2017

2018

2019

2020

2021

2022

See also 
 List of number-one hits (Germany)

Year
Germany
Best-selling singles by year